Vatica is a genus of plants in the family Dipterocarpaceae.

Species

, Plants of the World Online accepted the following species:

 Vatica abdulrahmaniana 
 Vatica acrocarpa 
 Vatica adenanii 
 Vatica affinis 
 Vatica albiramis 
 Vatica badiifolia 
 Vatica bantamensis 
 Vatica bella 
 Vatica borneensis 
 Vatica brevipes 
 Vatica brunigii 
 Vatica cauliflora 
 Vatica chartacea 
 Vatica chevalieri 
 Vatica chinensis 
 Vatica compressa 
 Vatica congesta 
 Vatica coriacea 
 Vatica cuneata 
 Vatica cuspidata 
 Vatica diospyroides 
 Vatica dulitensis 
 Vatica elliptica 
 Vatica endertii 
 Vatica flavida 
 Vatica flavovirens 
 Vatica glabrata 
 Vatica globosa 
 Vatica granulata 
 Vatica griffithii 
 Vatica guangxiensis 
 Vatica harmandiana 
 Vatica havilandii 
 Vatica heteroptera 
 Vatica hullettii 
 Vatica javanica 
 Vatica kanthanensis 
 Vatica lanceifolia 
 Vatica latiffii 
 Vatica lobata 
 Vatica lowii 
 Vatica maingayi 
 Vatica mangachapoi 
 Vatica maritima 
 Vatica mendozae 
 Vatica micrantha 
 Vatica mizaniana 
 Vatica najibiana 
 Vatica nitens 
 Vatica oblongifolia 
 Vatica obovata 
 Vatica obscura 
 Vatica odorata 
 Vatica pachyphylla 
 Vatica pallida 
 Vatica paludosa 
 Vatica palungensis 
 Vatica parvifolia 
 Vatica patentinervia 
 Vatica pauciflora 
 Vatica pedicellata 
 Vatica pentandra 
 Vatica philastreana 
 Vatica rassak 
 Vatica ridleyana 
 Vatica rotata 
 Vatica rynchocarpa 
 Vatica sarawakensis 
 Vatica scortechinii 
 Vatica soepadmoi 
 Vatica spatulata 
 Vatica stapfiana 
 Vatica subglabra 
 Vatica teysmanniana 
 Vatica umbonata 
 Vatica venulosa 
 Vatica vinosa 
 Vatica yeechongii

References

 
Malvales genera
Taxonomy articles created by Polbot